Wem is a market town in Shropshire, England,  north of Shrewsbury and  south of Whitchurch.

The name of the town is derived from the Old English wamm, meaning a marsh, as marshy land exists in the area of the town. Over time, this form evolved into "Wem".

As a caput of a barony and the centre of a large manor and parish Wem was a centre for justice and local government for centuries, and was the headquarters of the North Shropshire District Council until Shropshire became a unitary authority.   From the 12th century revisions to the hundreds of Shropshire, Wem was within the North Division of Bradford Hundred until the end of the 19th century.

According to Professor Richard Hoyle, Chairman of Victoria County History Shropshire, "Wem is an archetypal medieval-planned castle town and as such, can take its place alongside the best examples in England"

History

Prehistory and Roman 
The area now known as Wem is believed to have been settled prior to the Roman Conquest of Britain, by the Cornovii, Celtic Iron Age settlers: there is an Iron Age hillfort at nearby Bury Walls occupied over into the Roman period, and the Roman Road from Uriconium to Deva Victrix ran close by to the east at Soulton.

Early Mediaeval 
The Wem Hoard, a collection of coins deposited in the post Roman period, was found in land in the Wem area in 2019.

Norman and medieval periods 
Weme was an Anglo-Saxon estate, which transitioned into a planned Norman castle-town established after the conquest, with motte-and-bailey castle, parish church and burgage plots. The town is recorded in the Domesday Book as consisting of four manors in the hundred of Hodnet. The Domesday Book records that Wem was held by William Pantulf and comprised:

 Households: 4 villagers. 8 smallholders. 2 slaves.
 Land and resources: ploughland: 8 ploughlands. 1 lord's plough teams. 1 men's plough teams.
 Other resources: woodland 100 pigs.

with an annual value to lord: 2 pounds in 1086; up to 1 pound 7 shillings in 1066. 

Pantulf fought at the Battle of Hastings under his superior lord Earl Rodger.  Stafford Castle and Wem was granted to him with a further 28 manors in the area bounded by Clive, Ellesmere, Tilley and Cresswell, with some of the manors within this area belonging to other lords (Prees to the Bishop of Lichfield, and Soulton to the King's Chapel in Shrewsbury Castle, for example).  Pantulf refused to participate in an 1102 rebellion against King Henry I led by Robert de Belesme and assisted the crown defeating it, by marching with the king on Shrewsbury, during which the roads in the area were found to be bad, thickly wooded, providing cover for archers: 6000 foot soldiers cut down the woods and opened up the roads.  Hugo Pantulf, a descendant of William, was Baron of Wem in the mid 1100s: he attended the court of Richard the Lion Heart, was Sheriff of Shropshire, and likely attended the Crusades with the king, certainly paying scutage to towards his ransom.

The Norman town was probably enclosed by an earthwork: there is a record from the lord's steward of repairs to the town's enclosure in 1410, in which year the town had been "totally burnt and wasted by the Welsh rebels".  There is some speculation that the town had walls by the 1400s, as Samuel Garbet recorded an annotation to Fabyan's Chronicle that Wem "was totally burnt to the ground, with its walls and castle" in the reign of Henry VI.The supposed route of the walls or earthworks follows Noble Street, Wem Brook, the Roden and crossing the High Street between Leek Street and Chaple Street.

There were bars at the three entrances to the town, and a 1514 record exists of four men being employed to keep the bars on market days.

There is some thought that a market was held from the days of Pantuf, but King John certainly granted a charter in 1202. Initially, the permission was for a Sunday market.  This was subsequently revised, in 1351, to a Thursday: this followed a decree of the Archbishop of Canterbury, Simon Islip in the reign of Edward III that Sunday markets were banned.  Wem's market day remains Thursday to this day.

The manor was held by some of the great baronial families: including the Earls of Arundel, and the Lords Dacre, Bradford and Barnard and, after the 14th century the lord of the manor was not resident.

Large common fields farmed in strips lay outside the town walls: Pool Meadows (waste ground by the river within the lord's demesne); Cross Field (lying toward Soulton, and thought to have been named for a wayside cross); Middle Field (part of which was later known as Leper Middle Field, giving an insight into medieval life); and Chapel Field (named after a chapel of ease on the Horton Road dedicated to St John which was suppressed in 1548).  There was a Manorial Court House at Wem in which a twice yearly Court leet with the grim privilege of a gallows, hearing pleas including hue-and-cry, bloodshed.

Tudor Period 
In Henry VIII's reign Lord Dacre (d. 1563) began to fell Northwood, a task completed  by the Countess of Arundel (d. 1630), his grand-daughter. Dacre also drained the Old Pool, work again completed by his grand-daughter.

By 1561 the former castle enclosure was held at will by the Rector, John Dacre.  Manor perquisites noted in 1589 show that there were two annual fairs where the lord took a toll on all goods worth above 12d. sold by strangers and tenants (but not burgagers) and the profits of the courts.  In 1579 the lord's steward ruled that there should not be more than five alehouses in the township; however, unlicensed brewers were not prevented and were fined in number at each court leet.

1600s

Civil war 

In September 1642, during the English Civil War Charles I passed close by Wem  en route from Chester to Shrewsbury at the invitation of the corporation of the latter town, taking the route via Soulton and Lee Brockhurst, and in  
early 1642 Royalists were staying in Wem.  However, during the campaigns in Newbury and Gloucester the town was planted with a Parliamentarian garrison.  Under the supervision of Sir William Brereton a broad ditch four yards deep and wide and rampart, strengthened by a palisade made from timber cut from a felled 50 acre wood at Loppington was thrown up around the town to fortify it (some traces of this survive in the town). The route of this fortification was as follows: it began at a wooden tower on Soulton Road, just beyond the present station, from there it ran to "Shrewsbury Gate" crossing Well Walk and the bottom of Roden House garden; it than ran to the "Ellesmere Gate" where the stream crossed road; the earthworks continued along the back of Noble Street to "Whitchurch Gate"; on from there to "Drayton Gate" at 18 Aston Street and then back to the wooden tower.  Many of the buildings beyond this rampart were destroyed in fortifying the town, to prevent them being of use to attackers.

The town was the seat of the Shropshire Committee until the fall of Royalist Shrewsbury in 1645, and was subject to an attack by Lord Capel, with a force comprising, according to H. Pickering (who served under Lord Capell) writing to the Duchess of Beaufort:  3 cannon, 2 drakes, one great mortarpiece that carried a 30ln. bullet, had 120 odd wagons and carriages laden with bread, biskett, bare and other provisions and theire armye being formydable as consistynge of neer 5,000.   

Wem was not ready for the attack: the walls were not finished, the gates were not hinged, some of the guns on the ramparts were wooden dummies and the defending force consisted of only 40 male Parliamentarians; but then the local women rallied round positioning themselves in red coats in well chosen spots to mislead the Royalists.  So confident of success were the Royalist attackers that they only attacked on one side, approaching Wem only from Soulton Road, with the commander, Lord Capel, lightheartedly smoking his pipe half a mile from the town on that road. However, the town held off the attackers.  The resulting battle is remembered in this couplet: The women of Wem and a few musketeers,

Beat the Lord Capel and all his Cavaliers.According to Brereton's report, royalist losses were heavy:the great slaughter and execution which we performed upon the enemy when they set upon Wem.  There being six cartloads of dead men carried away at one time, besides the wounded and it is said, there were fifteen found burried in one grave.  Others were slayne and lefte in the open fields dead and unburyied whose naked bodies we saw miserably torne with the shott. and lyeing in the fields near the town, which wee gave orders to bee buryed... Little execution was done upon our men, we lost not above three in the town, a Major, one soldier and one boy  The sword of a Cromwellian trooper was dug up at Wem in 1923, and a cannonball of the same period was found during construction work at the Grammar School.

Restoration 
In 1648 Hinstock, Loppington, and Wem were assessed for sale, and lands were sold from the manorial holdings throughout the 1650s.  By 1665, when Daniel Wycherley bought the manor, the manorial property was much reduced from the holding it had been in 1648.
Wem was held by Judge Jeffreys (1645–1689), known as the "hanging judge" for his willingness to impose capital punishment on supporters of the Duke of Monmouth. His seat was Lowe Hall at The Lowe, Wem. In 1685 he was made Baron Jeffreys of Wem.

Great Fire of Wem 
On 3 March 1677, a fire destroyed many of the wooden buildings in the town, the event came to be known as the "Great Fire of Wem".

1700s 
By 1740 a workhouse existed in Wem, by 1777 it could house 20 inmates. During this period, the Old Town Hall, while still the Town Hall, was used for sittings of the County Court. The farming in this period saw an emphasis on dairy and grains. Other specializations included linen cloth.

The town was the childhood home of one of England's greatest essayists and critics, William Hazlitt (1778–1830). Hazlitt's father moved their family there when William was just a child. Hazlitt senior became the Unitarian Minister in the town occupying a building on Noble Street that still stands. In 2008 the town held a 230th Anniversary Celebration of Hazlitt's Life and work for five days, hosted by author Edouard d'Araille who gave series of talks and conference about 'William of Wem'. William Hazlitt moved away from Wem in later life and ultimately died in London. Artist John Astley, writer John Ireland, and pugilist Joe Berks all also grew up in the town.

Victorian period 
In the era of the stagecoach the town was served by two: 'The Hero' called at the Castle and the Union Stagecoach at the White Lion.

Within the town the sweet pea was first commercially cultivated, under the variety named Eckford Sweet Pea, after its inventor, nursery-man Henry Eckford. He first introduced a variety of the sweet pea in 1882, and set up in Wem in 1888, developing and producing many more varieties.

There is a road to signify the Eckford name, called Eckford Park (within Wem). Each year, the Eckford Sweet Pea Society of Wem have held a sweet pea festival apart from the years 2020 and 2021. In Victorian times, the town was known as "Wem, where the sweet peas grow".

20th century 

Several public buildings built in the early 20th century used the Arts and Crafts style: the Morgan Library building, the old post office and the current town hall building are examples.

First World War 
Fifty-five men of Wem are recorded as having fallen serving their country in the First World War.  The town's war memorial was dedicated in 1920.

Second World War 
In 1940 Anna Essinger (1879–1960), a German Jewish educator, evacuated  her boarding school, Bunce Court School from Otterden, in Kent to Trench Hall, near Wem. She facilitated Kindertransport.

The US created a storage facility at Aston Park estate on 14 December 1942. The facility was later converted to a prisoner of war camp, and was used for that purpose until 1948.

Nineteen men of Wem are recorded to have died serving in the Second World War.

After the War 
Wem was struck by an F1/T2 tornado on 23 November 1981, as part of the record-breaking nationwide tornado outbreak on that day.

In November 1995 the town hall suffered a catastrophic fire.  It reopened after repair, renewal, and redesign in 2000.

21st century 
From 2002 to 2019 the Morgan Library building was leased to 'Mythstories', which styles itself as the world's first museum of storytelling. Wem is a Transition Town.

A "lost castle" was recently discovered near the town.

In 2023 efforts began to establish a community owned pub in the district.

Legends

Secret tunnels 
There is said to have been a tunnel from the cellars under the castle mound to the building formerly known as "The Moathouse", and then on under Mill Street to Roden House, the former rectory, and there are blocked doorways in the cellars of both of these houses.

Wem ghost 

In 1995 an amateur photographer photographed a blaze which destroyed Wem Town Hall; the photo appeared to show the ghostly figure of a young female in a window of the burning building, dressed in 'old-fashioned' clothes.

Although the photographer (who died in 2005) denied forgery, after his death it was suggested that the girl in his photo bore a 'striking similarity' with one in a postcard of the town from 1922.

Treacle Mines 
Wem is reputed to have "treacle mines", although It is not possible to mine treacle.  Two explanations have been offered for this legend: (a) that a confectioners shop, despite the rationing and food shortages of the Second World War was apparently always in stock of candy; alternatively (b) the byproduct of the tanning industry within the town was considered to resemble treacle.

Coat of arms and flag 
The Wem Town Council use arms which are the shield of Shropshire, with a phoenix crest, with the shield laid over of an axe and a scythe.

Economy 

The pre-modern economy of the town was based on agriculture and forestry and the processing of its output. Brewing, initially a cottage industry, was carried out in Wem as early as 1700, when Richard Gough wrote of a contemporary in his History of Myddle a Latin aphorism he translated: Let slaves admire base things, but my friend still/My cup and can with Wem's stoute ale shall fill.

By 1900 a Shrewsbury and Wem Brewery Company traded on a widespread scale after acquiring the brewery in Noble Street previously run by Charles Henry Kynaston. The company was taken over in turn by Greenall Whitley & Co Ltd but the brewery was closed in 1988. From 1986 to 1988 the brewery was the shirt sponsor for Shrewsbury Town.

There is a mid-sized industrial estate to the east of the town.

Governance
Wem was historically the centre of a large parish, which became a civil parish in 1866.

In 1900 the outer parts of the parish were separated to form the civil parish of Wem Rural, and the town itself became the civil parish of Wem Urban, coextensive with Wem Urban District.  In 1967 the urban district was abolished and became part of North Shropshire Rural District. From 1974 to 2009 it was part of North Shropshire district.

The parish council of Wem Urban has exercised its right to call itself a town council.

The electoral ward of Wem for the purposes of elections to Shropshire Council also covers part of Wem Rural parish. The population of this ward at the 2011 Census was 8,234.

Geography
The River Roden flows to the south of the town.

The Shropshire Way long distance waymarked path passes through Wem.

Culture and community

Recreation areas 

There are recreation areas at the Wem Recreation Ground and the Millennium Green (Wem Millennium Green being the smallest such green in the country).

Sport and Clubs 

Sports clubs within the town include:

Wem Town Football Club
 Wem Cricket Club
 Wem Tennis Club
 Wem United Services Bowling Club
 Wem Bowling Club
 Wem Albion Bowling Club

Clubs and societies include:

Wem Amateur  Dramatics Society (established 1919)
Sweetpea society
 Rotary Club of Wem and District
 Wem Sports and Social Club
 The Senior Club
 Wem & District Garden Club
 The United Services Club
Wem Jubilee Band (established 1977, with origins on the 1930s)

Events 
Each year Wem holds a traditional town carnival which is held on the first Saturday of September, as well as the Sweet Pea Festival on the third weekend of July. Wem Vehicles of Interest Rally & Grand Parade also runs alongside the Sweet Pea Festival on the Sunday.

A Wem 10 km running race was instituted in 2019.

There is a Wem Transport show annually in July.

Religious life 

Within the town there are four main churches:

 the Anglican Parish Church of St. Peter & St. Paul
Baptist Church 
Methodist
 and Roman Catholic.

Transport

Rail

The Crewe and Shrewsbury Railway was completed in 1858, and Wem has been connected to national rail services since this time.

The town has a railway station located on the Welsh Marches Line. All services are operated by Transport for Wales. The majority of services that call at the station are between Shrewsbury and Crewe, however, some long-distance services to Manchester Piccadilly, Cardiff Central, Swansea, Carmarthen and Milford Haven also stop at the station during peak times.

Canals 
The canal network came closest to Wem at Whixhall and Edstaston; the Ellesmere canal was closed to navigation by Act of Parliament in 1944.

Air 
There is an airfield at Sleap.

Bus 
The town is served by the 511 bus route, operated by Arriva Midlands North, which runs between Shrewsbury and Whitchurch. Some services terminate in Wem and do not continue to Whitchurch.

Education 
St Peters is a Church of England primary school in Wem.

Thomas Adams School is a state-funded secondary school, established in 1650. This was an independent grammar school until 1976, at which point it merged with Wem Modern School to form a comprehensive school. It also has a Sixth Form College on site.

A number of private schools have operated in Wem over the centuries.  William Hazlitt's father ran a 'model crammer for the dissenting rationalist' in the town, the 'Mrs Swanswick's School' ran from the late 1700s to the 1840s and one of its headmasters, Joseph Pattison, took a leading role in founding British Schools to educate children from less advantaged families. A further six private schools operated out of Wem over time.

Local landmarks and attractions 

Fenn's, Whixall and Bettisfield Mosses National Nature Reserve
 Hodnet Hall Gardens
Soulton Hall and Soulton Long Barrow
 Whixall Marina
 Hawkstone Park

Twin towns 

Since 1978, Wem has been twinned with Fismes in France, after which is named a road in Wem, Fismes Way.

Notable townsfolk

Sir Rowland Hill coordinator of the Geneva Bible translation, Tudor statesman (privy councillor and 1549 Lord Mayor of London) philanthropist and scholar, associated with the character "Old Sir Rowland" in the Shakespeare comedy As You Like It
Sir Thomas Adams, 1st Baronet (1586 in Wem – 1667/1668) Lord Mayor of London and MP for the City of London from 1654–1655 and 1656–1658.
William Wycherley (1641–1716) a restoration dramatist, brought up at nearby Trench Farm.
George Jeffreys, 1st Baron Jeffreys (1645-1689) aka 'Judge Jeffreys' took his title as Baron Jeffreys of Wem in 1685; had house at Lowe Hall near the town.
Samuel Garbet (died 1751?) master at Wem Grammar School, wrote the first history of Wem
Philip Holland (1721 in Wem – 1789) nonconformist minister.
John Astley (1724 in Wem – 1787) portrait painter and amateur architect
William Hazlitt (1778–1830) an essayist, drama and literary critic, painter and philosopher.
Sir John Bickerton Williams (1792-1855 in Wem), lawyer, nonconformist historian.
Edward Whalley-Tooker (1863 in Wem – 1940) cricketer, played for Hampshire.
Anna Essinger (1879–1960) a German Jewish educator; during WWII cared for refugee children in Trench Hall
Donald Court (1912 in Wem-1994) paedriatician.
Peter Jones (1920 in Wem – 2000) actor, screenwriter and broadcaster and for 29 years a regular contestant on the panel game Just A Minute
Peter Vaughan (1923 in Wem – 2016) character actor, known for his role as Grouty in the sitcom Porridge
Barry Davies (1944 in Wem - 2016) SAS soldier and author
Sybil Ruscoe (born 1960 in Wem) radio and television presenter 
Greg Davies (born 1968) stand-up comedian, actor was brought up and went to Thomas Adams School in Wem
Neil Faith (born 1981) English semi-retired professional wrestler, went to Thomas Adams School in Wem

Further reading  

 Woodwood, Iris "A Story of Wem".  1952, Wem Urban District Council, Wildings of Shrewsbury. 
 Everard,  Judith et al "Victoria County History Shropshire – Wem", 2019.
 The History of Wem by Samuel Garbet (1818)

Freedom of the Town
The following people and military units have received the Freedom of the Town of Wem.

Military Units
 RAF Shawbury: 1 August 2018.

See also 

Listed buildings in Wem Urban
Listed buildings in Wem Rural

References

External links

Wem Town Hall – history, events, information
Old Pictures of Wem

 
Towns in Shropshire
Market towns in Shropshire
Towns of the Welsh Marches